Tania Antoshina (Russian: Таня Антошина, Татьяна Константиновна Антошина; also transliterated as Tatiana Antoshina, Tanya Antoshina, Tatjana Antoschina, Tatyana Antoschina) (b. 1 May 1956, Krasnoyarsk Siberia, Russia), is a Russian contemporary artist, curator, PhD in art history, one of the first participants of the gender movement in Moscow art. In 1991 she completed postgraduate studies at the Stroganov Moscow State University of Arts and Industry, then pursued design at the Modern Design Laboratory since 1994. She received a PhD in Fine Arts Stroganov Moscow State University of Arts and Industry. Antoshina is a member of the Moscow Artists Union. Her work has been widely exhibited, including the Venice Biennale including the Venice Biennale in the Pavilion of Mauritius in 2015 (The Pavilion of Mauritius was introduced in 2015 with an exhibition ‘From One Citizen You Gather an Idea’), and is in the permanent collections of several museums.

Collections
Russian Museum, St. Petersburg, Russia;
Tretyakov Gallery, Moscow, Russia;
National Centre for Contemporary Arts, Moscow, Russia;
MUMOK, Vienna, Austria;
New Museum Weserburg Bremen, Bremen, Germany;
National Museum of Women in the Arts , Washington DC, USA;
Corcoran Art Museum, Washington DC, USA;
American University Museum, Washington DC, USA;
Omi International Arts Center collection, New York, USA;
Mint Museum, Charlotte, North Carolina, USA;
Casoria Contemporary Art Museum, Naples, Italy;
Olympic Fine Arts Museum, Beijing, China;
Penang State Art Museum, Penang, Malaysia;
Museum of Decorative-Applied and Folk Arts, Moscow, Russia;
Perm Museum of Contemporary Art, Perm, Russia;
Krasnoyarsk Cultural Historical Museum complex, Krasnoyarsk, Russia;
Asia-Pacific Institute of Art & Research, Jeollabuk-do, South Korea;
The Francis J. Greenburger collection, New York;
Kolodzei Art Foundation, New York;
Tony Podesta collection, Washington;
Sir Elton John Collection, London.

Selected exhibitions

Solo shows
Cold Land. Northern Tales, ZARYA Center for Contemporary Art, Vladivostok, 2017-2018 
Reggae Feminism or 88 March, Dukley Art Center, Kotor, Montenegro, 2017
Museum of a Woman, Podgorica Museums & Galleries, Gallery Art, Podgorica, Montenegro, 2015
Cold Land, Krasnoyarsk Museum Center, Krasnoyarsk, Russia, 2014
My Favorite Artists, Galerie Vallois, Paris, France, 2010
Alice and Gagarin, VP Studio, Moscow, Russia, 2010
My Favorite Artists, Mario Mauroner Gallery, Vienna, Austria, 2008
Space Travelers, Guelman Gallery, Moscow, Russia, 2006
Museum of a Woman, White Space Gallery, London, UK, 2004
The Voyeurism of Alice Guy, Guelman Gallery, Moscow, Russia, 2002
Museum of a Woman, Florence Lynch Gallery, NY, USA, 2001
April in Moscow, Guelman Gallery, Moscow, Russia, 1999
Museum of a Woman, Guelman Gallery, Moscow, Russia, 1997
Women of Russia, Guelman Gallery, Moscow, Russia
To Moor, Expo 88, Moscow, Russia, 1996
The Hound of Baskervilles, Regina Gallery, Moscow, Russia, 1992

Group shows 
 From Non-Conformism to Feminisms: Russian Women Artists from the Kolodzei Art Foundation, Museum of Russian Art (TMORA), Minnesota, 2018-2019
 18-th ASIAN ART BIENNALE BANGLADESH, Bangladesh Shilpakala Academy, National Academy of Fine and Performing Arts, Dhaka, 2018
 Women at Work: Subverting the Feminine in Post-Soviet Russia, White Space Gallery, London, 2018
 ART RIOT: POST-SOVIET ACTIONISM, Saatchi Gallery, London, 2017-2018
 17th Asian Art Biennale Bangladesh, Bangladesh Shilpakala Academy National Art Gallery, Dhaka, Bangladesh, 2016
 56 Venice Biennale, State pavilion of Mauritius, 2015
Gender Check, MUMOK, Vienna, 2012
Moscow — NY = Parallel Play, Chelsea Art Museum, NY, 2008
Moscow Biennale, Moscow, Russa, 2007
SIGHT/INSIGHT, Corcoran Art Museum, Washington DC, 2006
Photo London, Royal Academy of Arts, London, 2005
After the wall, National Gallery (Berlin), Berlin, Hamburger Bahnhof, 2001
After the Wall, Ludwig Museum, Budapest, 2000
After the Wall, Moderna Museet, Stockholm, 1999

Honours and awards
Scholarship Residence Center for Contemporary Art "Zarya", Vladivostok, Russia, 2017;
Scholarship Residence Dukley European Art Community, Kotor, Montenegro, 2017;
Scholarship Residence Dukley European Art Community, Kotor, Montenegro, 2015;
Scholarship Residency KRITI Varanasi, India, 2013;
Scholarship Residences MARIPOSA Canary Islands, Spain, 2012;
Olympic Art Gold Medal, Olympic Fine Arts, London, United Kingdom, 2012;
Alternative Prize “Russian Activist Art”, Moscow, Russia, 2012;
Olympic Art Gold Medal, Olympic Fine Arts, Beijing, China, 2008;
Five Rings Prize, Olympic Landscape Sculpture Design Contest, Beijing, China, 2008;
Laureate of the Magmart video festival, Naples, Italy, 2005;
Scholarship Omi International Arts Center, NY, USA, 2005;
Winner of the "Silver Camera",  Multimedia Art Museum, Moscow, 2005;
Winner of the "Silver Camera", Multimedia Art Museum, Moscow, 2002;
Scholarship of the Yaddo Residence, New York, USA, 2001;
Winner of the contest "Modern Russia", Photo Center on Gogol Boulevard, Moscow, Russia, 2001;
Participant of the International Symposium CERAMICS - PAINTING - GRAPHICS Bad Lippspringe, Germany, 1992;
Best Report at the Scientific Conference of Post-Graduate Students and Teachers of the Moscow Institute of Industrial Arts, Moscow, Russia, 1985;
Silver Medal of VDNH for Teaching Work, Moscow, Russia, 1985;
Best Teacher of the Krasnoyarsk Art Academy, Krasnoyarsk, Russia, 1984.

Curatorship projects
The Quest of Power, special project of 6 Moscow Biennale 2015;
Terra Incognita, expedition to South Siberia for collection of ethnic and cultural material, 2014;
V-5, Space as a Presence, in partnership with A.Galenz and G.Kuznetsov, InteriorDAsein, Berlin, 2012;
Sons of the Big Dipper, together with G.Kuznetsov, PROEKT FABRIKA, Moscow, 2011;
Two Museums, in partnership with G.Vysheslavsky, Champino, Velletri, Italy, 1992.

References 

Thomas Deecke, Markus Bulling (2001). ‘’8. Triennale Kleinplastik Fellbach Vor-Sicht, Rück-Sicht’’. Germany, Stadt Fellbach Auflage.
Александр Боровский. «Как-то раз Зевксис с Паррасием... Современное искусство: практические наблюдения». Литрес, 2017. .
Jonson Lena (2015).  ‘‘Art and Protest in Putin's Russia’‘, Taylor and Francis, pp. XII, 207, 227, 240, 261, .
Viola Hildebrand-Schat (2014). ‘‘Appropriation oder Simulacrum?’‘, p. 229-233, in Guido Isekenmeier, ‘‘Interpiktorialität: Theorie und Geschichte der Bild-Bild-Bezüge’‘, transcript Verlag, .
Angela Dimitrakaki, Katrin Kivimaa, Katja Kobolt, Izabela Kowalczyk, Pawel Leszkowicz, Suzana Milevska, Bojana Pejic, Rebeka Põldsam, Mara Traumane, Airi Triisberg, Hedvig Turai (2012). “Working with Feminism: Curating and Exhibitions in Eastern Europe, Acta Universitatis Tallinnensis: Artes’’, p. 85. Estonia: Tallinn University Press / Tallinna Ülikooli Kirjastus. .
Klaus Krüger / Leena Crasemann / Matthias Weiß: (Hgg.) (2011). ‘‘Re-Inszenierte Fotografie’‘. Munich, Germany: Wilhelm Fink Verlag.(2011) ;
Thomas Deecke (2010). ‘‘Leben mit der Kunst’‘. Germany: Nicolaische Verlagsbuchhandlung. ;
Alain Monvoisin (2008). ‘‘DICTIONNAIRE INTERNATIONAL DE LA SCULPTURE MODERNE ET CONTEMPORAINE’‘, p. 26-27. Paris, France, Regard. .
Julia Tulovsky (2008). ‘’The Claude and Nina Gruen Collection of Contemporary Russian Art’’, pp. 24, 79. Jane Voorhees Zimmerli Art Museum, .
Matthias Winzen; Nicole Fritz (2007). Bodycheck: Catalog of the 10th Fellbach Triennial of Contemporary Sculpture. Germany: Snoek Verlagsgesellschaft. , p. 292;
Tatiana Smorodinskaya (Russian, Middlebury Coll.), Karen Evans-Romaine (Russian, Ohio Univ.), and Helena Goscilo (Slavic languages, Univ. of Pittsburgh) (ed.)  (2007). ‘‘Encyclopedia of contemporary Russian Culture (Encyclopedias of Contemporary Culture Series), pp. 19, 42-43. Abingdon, UK and New York, USA: Routledge. .
Игорь Кон (2003) Мужское тело в истории культуры p. 378-382; Издательство: СЛОВО/SLOVO .
АРТ-Конституция (иллюстрированная АРТ – Конституция Российской Федерации, в создании которой принимали участие наиболее актуальные художники начала 21 века). сс. 110, 111, 131, 132, 272, 273. Тексты: Зураб Церетели, Екатерина Деготь, Наталья Колодзей. Москва: Музей современного искусства, 2003. .
СЛОВАРЬ ГЕНДЕРНЫХ ТЕРМИНОВ / Под ред. А. А. Денисовой / Региональная общественная организация "Восток-Запад: Женские Инновационные Проекты". М.: Информация XXI век, 2002. 256 с.
Renee Baigell, Matthew Baigell (July 1, 2001). ‘’Peeling Potatoes, Painting Pictures: Women Artists in Post-Soviet Russia, Estonia, and Latvia. The First Decade’’. The Dodge Soviet Nonconformist Art publication series, p. 55. New Brunswick, NJ, USA: Jane Voorhees Zimmerli Art Museum: Rutgers. .
Женщина в обществе: мифы и реалии : сборник статей / редактор-составитель Круминг Л.С. , сс. 1, 4. Москва : Информация - XXI век, 2001. , сс. 1, 4.
Женщина и визуальные знаки : сборник / Ин-т "Открытое общество", сс. 232-234. - М. : Идея-Пресс, 2000.

Periodicals 
This Leads to Fire: From Nonconformism to Global Capitalism, Selections from the Kolodzei Art Foundation Collection, Neuberger Museum of Art at Purchase College, SUNY, 2015.
Google Arts and Culture. Quantum Leap, May - November 2015.
Female Artists and the Nude Male, Part 5, July 14, 2014.
Gesellschaft vor Gericht, Neue Zürcher Zeitung, 5.3.2013.
IWMPost, N110 may – August 2012.
Die Einheit des Universums, taz, BENNO SCHIRRMEISTER,  23.12.2006.
Revolution, Transit Art Space, April 2006.
Hans-Dieter Fronz, KUNSTFORUM, Bd.171 Juli-August 2004, p. 370-371, ‘’Na Kurort! Russische Kunst heute’‘, Zurich, 2004.
Pat Simpson, ‘’Peripheralising Patriarchy? Gender and Identity in Post-Soviet Art: A View from the West’‘, Oxford Art Journal, Vol. 27, No. 3 (2004), Oxford University Press, pp. 406, 407, 2004. 
Brian Dillon, ‘’Tatiana Antoshina’‘, MODERN PAINTERS, summer 2004, pp.120-121. 
‘’СAPITAL PERSPECTIVE’‘, Moscow, pp. 5-6, 2002. 
Francesca Piovano, ‘’Art-Forum’‘, CVA, issue 33, 2001.
Texte zur Kunst, Band 11, Ausgaben 41-42, Texte zur Kunst GMBH, p. 142, 2001.
Elfi Kreis, ‘’Absurdistan’‘, Kunstzeitung, nr. 57, mai 2001.
‘’Letzte Tage IsKusstwo 2000’‘, Oberbauer, Volksblah, 24/25, 2.2001.
Chrictopf Wiedemann, ‘’Freie Radikale auf ihrem Weg in den Westen’‘, Seite 18, Suddeutsche Zeitung, Nr.13, 17.1.2001.
Von Michael Dultz, ‘’Klassische Frauenszenen mit Mannern nachgestellt’‘ , Die Welt Bayern, 15.01.2001.
Brita Sachs, ‘’Sei frech und zeige deine Katastrophen’‘ , Frankfurter Augemeine Zaitung, Februar 2001.
Rod Mengham, ‘’The refugee aesthetic?’‘ , TATE, issue 20, 2000.

External links 
Tatyana Antoshina's site
Tatyana Antoshina on ARTFACT
Tatyana Antoshina on ARTNET

1956 births
Living people
Multimedia artists
Women multimedia artists
20th-century Russian artists
20th-century Russian women artists
21st-century Russian artists
21st-century Russian women artists
People from Krasnoyarsk
Feminist artists
Stroganov Moscow State Academy of Arts and Industry alumni